Namdong station is a closed railway station in Sukch'ŏn County, South P'yŏngan Province, North Korea; it was the terminus of the Namdong Line from P'yŏngnam Onch'ŏn on the P'yŏngnam Line, and of the Namdong Branch of the Sŏhae Line.

References 

Railway stations in North Korea
Buildings and structures in South Pyongan Province